Falcuna campimus, the scarce marble, is a butterfly in the family Lycaenidae. It is found in Liberia, Ivory Coast, Ghana, Nigeria, Cameroon, Gabon and possibly Sierra Leone. The habitat consists of primary forests.

Subspecies
Falcuna campimus campimus (Liberia, Ivory Coast, Ghana, Nigeria: south and the Cross River loop, Cameroon, possibly Sierra Leone)
Falcuna campimus dilatata (Schultze, 1923) (southern Cameroon, Gabon)

References

Butterflies described in 1890
Poritiinae
Butterflies of Africa